Zhigu Station, is a station of Line 5 and Line 9 of the Tianjin Metro. It started operations on 1 May 2011.

References

Railway stations in Tianjin
Railway stations in China opened in 2011
Tianjin Metro stations